Vas (or ) was an administrative county (comitatus) of the Kingdom of Hungary. Its territory is now divided between Hungary, Austria and Slovenia.

Geography

Vas County shared borders with the Austrian lands Lower Austria and Styria and the Hungarian counties Sopron, Veszprém and Zala. It stretched between the river Mura in the south, the foothills of the Alps in the west and the river Marcal in the east. The Rába River flowed through the county. Its area was 5474 km² around 1910.

History
Vas County arose as one of the first comitatuses of the Kingdom of Hungary.

In 1920 by the Treaty of Trianon, the western part of the county became part of Austria, and a small part in the southwest became part of the newly formed Kingdom of Serbs, Croats and Slovenes (from 1929 as Yugoslavia). The remainder stayed in Hungary. The former Yugoslavian part of the county was occupied and annexed by Hungary between 1941 and 1945 during World War II. In 1950, a small part of former Sopron County went to Vas county, while some villages north of Zalaegerszeg went to Zala County, and a small region west of Pápa went to Veszprém County.

Since 1991, when Slovenia became independent from Yugoslavia, the Yugoslavian part of former Vas county (known in Slovenian as Prekmurje) has been part of the Republic of Slovenia. In 1919 there was briefly proclaimed Republic of Prekmurje, but it existed only a few days, alike the Lajtabánság.

Demographics

1900
In 1900, the county had a population of 418,905 people and was composed of the following linguistic communities:

Total:

 Hungarian: 222,474 (53.0%)
 German: 125,570 (30.0%)
 Croatian: 17,896 (4.3%)
 Slovak: 284 (0.1%)
 Romanian: 43 (0.0%)
 Serbian: 21 (0.0%)
 Ruthenian: 4 (0.0%)
 Other or unknown: 52,613 (12.6%)

According to the census of 1900, the county was composed of the following religious communities:

Total:

 Roman Catholic: 313,858 (74.9%)
 Lutheran: 83,340 (19.9%)
 Calvinist: 12,151 (2.9%)
 Jewish: 9,429 (2.3%)
 Greek Catholic: 47 (0.0%)
 Greek Orthodox: 47 (0.0%)
 Unitarian: 15 (0.0%)
 Other or unknown: 18 (0.0%)

1910

In 1910, the county had a population of 435,793 people and was composed of the following linguistic communities:

Total:

 Hungarian: 247,985 (56.9%)
 German: 117,169 (26.89%)
 Croatian: 16,230 (3.72%)
 Slovak: 288 (0.07%)
 Ruthenian: 48 (0.01%)
 Serbian: 23 (0.01%)
 Romanian: 14 (0.0%)
 Other or unknown: 54,036 (12.4%)

According to the census of 1910, the county was composed of the following religious communities:

Total:

 Roman Catholic: 331,269 (76.02%)
 Lutheran: 82,027 (18.82%)
 Calvinist: 12,597 (2.89%)
 Jewish: 9,649 (2.21%)
 Greek Catholic: 151 (0.03%)
 Greek Orthodox: 71 (0.02%)
 Unitarian: 19 (0.0%)
 Other or unknown: 10 (0.0%)

Subdivisions 

In the early 20th century, the subdivisions of Vas county were:

The towns of Oberwart and Güssing are now in Austria; Murska Sobota is now in Slovenia.

References

States and territories disestablished in 1920
Counties in the Kingdom of Hungary
Vas County
Oberwart District
Jennersdorf District
Prekmurje